The Men's Greco-Roman 77 kg competition of the wrestling events at the 2022 Mediterranean Games in Oran, Algeria, was held from 26 June to 27 June at the EMEC Hall.

Results
 Legend
 F — Won by fall

References

Greco-Roman 77 kg